Representation may refer to:

Law and politics
Representation (politics), political activities undertaken by elected representatives, as well as other theories
 Representative democracy, type of democracy in which elected officials represent a group of people
 Representation, in contract law a pre-contractual statement that may (if untrue) result in liability for misrepresentation
 Labor representation, or worker representation, the work of a union representative who represents and defends the interests of fellow labor union members
 Legal representation, provided by a barrister, lawyer, or other advocate
 Lobbying or interest representation, attempts to influence the actions, policies, or decisions of officials
 "No taxation without representation", a 1700s slogan that summarized one of the American colonists' 27 colonial grievances in the Thirteen Colonies, which was one of the major causes of the American Revolution
 Permanent representation, a type of diplomatic mission

Arts, entertainment, and media
 Representation (arts), use of signs that stand in for and take the place of something else
 Representation (journal), an academic journal covering representative democracy
 Depiction, non-verbal representation through two-dimensional images (pictures) of things seen, remembered or imagined

Cognitive science
 Representation (psychology), a hypothetical 'internal' cognitive symbol that represents external reality
 Knowledge representation, the study of formal ways to describe knowledge
 Representation theory (linguistics), a theoretical framework in generative linguistics

Mathematics
 Representation (mathematics), a very general relationship that expresses similarities between objects
 Group representation, describes abstract groups in terms of linear transformations of vector spaces
 Lie algebra representation, a way of writing a Lie algebra as a set of matrices in such a way that the Lie bracket is given by the commutator
 Multiple representations (mathematics education), ways to symbolize, to describe and to refer to the same mathematical entity
 Representation of a Lie group, a linear action of a Lie group on a vector space

Other uses
 Representation (chemistry), graphic representation of the molecular structure of a chemical compound
 Social representation, a stock of values, ideas, beliefs, and practices that are shared among the members of groups and communities
Representative sample in statistics

See also 

 Data visualization, the creation and study of the visual representation of data
 Reprazent, a British drum and bass group
 Represent (disambiguation)